Fox is a Polish TV channel which broadcasts mainly American series produced by 20th Century Fox Television. Fox HD was launched on November 6, 2010 at 20:00. Since that day it has been available in two DTH platforms: n and Cyfrowy Polsat. SD version of the channel was launched in January 2011 and is available in cable television companies and since February 2011 also in Cyfrowy Polsat. The channel's accessibility is being expanded.

Programming

Animated series

 Family Guy   
 The Simpsons
 The Cleveland Show
 Archer
 The Life & Times of Tim
 Bob's Burgers

Action series
 Life
 Life on Mars
 Prison Break
 The Walking Dead
 Tiempo Final

Drama series
 Bones
 Breaking Bad
 The Cape
 The Chicago Code
 Defying Gravity
 Dollhouse
 The Finder
 The Glades
 Heroes
 Homeland
 The Hot Zone
 Kdabra
 The Listener
 Mad Men
 Sons of Anarchy
 Touch
 The X-Files

Comedy series
 Do Not Disturb
 Living in Your Car
 Weeds
 The League
 Modern Family
 Traffic Light
 Louie

Comedy-drama series
 Glee
 White Collar

Science fiction series
 Roswell
 The Walking Dead
 American Horror Story

References

External links 
  Official Site
  

Poland
Television channels in Poland
Television channels and stations established in 2010